Gennady Yegorovich Yevryuzhikhin (born 4 February 1944 in Kazan; died 15 March 1998 in Moscow) was a Russian footballer.

Honours
 Soviet Top League winner: 1976 (spring).
 Soviet Top League runner-up: 1967, 1970.
 Soviet Cup winner: 1967, 1970.
 UEFA Cup Winners' Cup finalist: 1972.
 Olympic bronze: 1972.

International career
He earned 37 caps for the USSR national football team, and participated in UEFA Euro 1968 and the 1970 FIFA World Cup. He also earned a bronze medal in football at the 1972 Summer Olympics, scoring one goal against Sudan.

External links
Profile (in Russian)

1944 births
Footballers from Kazan
1998 deaths
Russian footballers
Soviet footballers
Soviet Union international footballers
UEFA Euro 1968 players
1970 FIFA World Cup players
Soviet Top League players
FC Dynamo Saint Petersburg players
FC Dynamo Moscow players
Olympic footballers of the Soviet Union
Footballers at the 1972 Summer Olympics
Olympic bronze medalists for the Soviet Union
Olympic medalists in football
Medalists at the 1972 Summer Olympics
Burials in Troyekurovskoye Cemetery
Association football forwards